Ocnele Mari is a town located in Vâlcea County, Oltenia, Romania. The town administers eight villages: Buda, Cosota, Făcăi, Gura Suhașului, Lunca, Ocnița, Slătioarele, and Țeica.

Ocnele Mari also borders several communes: Mihăești to the south, Bunești to the west, and Păușești-Măglași and Vlădești to the north.

Notable people
 Ioan Luchian Mihalea

See also
Solar eclipse of August 11, 1999

References

Populated places in Vâlcea County
Localities in Oltenia
Towns in Romania
Mining communities in Romania
Monotowns in Romania